Windsor Railway Bridge is a wrought iron 'bow and string' bridge in Windsor, Berkshire, crossing the River Thames on the reach between Romney Lock and Boveney Lock. It carries the branch line between Slough and Windsor.

The Windsor Railway Bridge was designed by the famed British civil engineer Isambard Kingdom Brunel, and is considered to be a forerunner to his last major work, the Royal Albert Bridge. It was built during the 1840s to carry the Slough to Windsor & Eton Line of the Great Western Railway (GWR). On account of concerns raised by the Provost of Eton College, the bridge had to cross the river while keeping it unobstructed in its entirety. Construction of the railway was subsequently authorised during 1848 and proceeded at a rapid pace, the line and bridge alike being first opened to traffic on 8 October 1849.

During the early 1860s, the original wooden approach viaducts were replaced by arched brick counterparts. During 1908, the bridge's cast iron piles were replaced by brick abutments, somewhat shortening its span to 184 ft 6in, as well as the replacement of both cross girders and rail bearers with steel equivalents. While the Windsor Railway Bridge was originally built to carry a twin-track arrangement, only a single line has crossed the bridge since the railway was singled as a rationalisation measure during the 1960s. In 1975, the bridge became a Grade II* listed structure.

History
The construction of what would become Slough to Windsor & Eton Line was an early ambition of the Great Western Railway (GWR), but had been delayed and thus unable to be included in the original Parliamentary Act obtained by the company on account of objections raised by the Provost of the nearby Eton College. Parliamentary approval for the line was finally issued in 1848, but was accompanied by a provision for the protection of amenities pertaining to the college, which included the requirement that the River Thames be kept clear where the railway crossed it, thus necessitating advanced design and materials.

Irrespective of this complication, construction of the line and bridge alike commenced almost immediately. The contractor appointed to build the bridge was a Mr George Hannet. On 8 October 1849, the completed route was opened to traffic.

Since its completion, numerous refurbishments and alternations to the original structure have been performed. Between 1861 and 1865, the original wooden trestle viaducts forming the approaches to the Windsor Railway Bridge were replaced by arched brick equivalents. During 2019, the viaduct was visually restored, removing graffiti.

Design
The Windsor Railway Bridge is a single-span structure, comprising three bowstring trusses which formed two bays, each carrying one of the original pair of tracks traversing the bridge. It is believed to be the world's oldest wrought iron railway bridge that remains in regular service. Designed by Isambard Kingdom Brunel, the bridge has been considered to be a forerunner of Brunel's final masterpiece, the Royal Albert Bridge at Saltash. Due to its historical and engineering significance, the Windsor Railway Bridge became a Grade II* listed structure in 1975.

As originally built, the bridge had a skewed span of 202 ft, which were carried on six ft diameter cast iron piles filled with concrete. However, during 1908, these piles were replaced by several brick abutments; this alteration also had the effect of reducing the bridge's span to 184 ft 6in. In conjunction with this work, other refurbishments of the bridge were carried out, such as the replacement of both cross girders and rail bearers with steel counterparts.

Although the bridge bore two tracks, that on the upstream (west) side was removed as one of the rationalisations of the 1960s. The resulting space has since been reused for a sewer and a water main.

See also 
 Crossings of the River Thames

References

External links
 Windsor Railway Bridge via nationaltransporttrust.org.uk
 Windsor Branch Railway via history.networkrail.co.uk
 The Railways at Windsor via thamesweb.co.uk

Railway bridges in Berkshire
Bridges completed in 1849
Bridges across the River Thames
Buildings and structures in Windsor, Berkshire
Grade II* listed buildings in Berkshire
Bridges by Isambard Kingdom Brunel
Tied arch bridges in the United Kingdom
1849 establishments in England
Grade II* listed railway bridges and viaducts